Pond Run may refer to:

Pond Run, New Jersey
Pond Run, Ohio